Jacksonville North Pulaski School District (JNPSD) is a public school district system located in Jacksonville, Arkansas, USA. The district serves the city of Jacksonville and a portion of northeastern Pulaski County. Upon detachment from Pulaski County Special School District July 1, 2016, the district assumed operation of one high school, one middle school, and seven elementary schools.

History 
Until their detachment in 2016, Jacksonville-area schools had been part of the Pulaski County Special School District, one of the largest school districts in Arkansas. In the years leading up to September 2008, parts of the Jacksonville community expressed a desire to split from the PCSSD. This measure was approved by the board of the PCSSD during that month, legally clearing the way for the formation of what would become a separate Jacksonville school district.

In a response to a petition signed by more than 2,000 voters, the Arkansas Board of Education ordered an election to carve a new school district out of the existing PCSSD. Jacksonville voters approved of the separation on September 16, 2014 with a vote of 3,769 for and 218 against (94.53% to 5.47%).

The Arkansas Board of Education approved an order in November 2014 to create a new Jacksonville-area district. The future district would continue to be administered by the Pulaski County Special School District until final detachment projected for July 1, 2016.

A negotiated plan to separate the JNPSD from the PCSSD was approved by U.S. District Judge D. Price Marshall Jr. on October 14, 2015. The plan spelled out how the two school districts would split a multimillion-dollar state desegregation aid payment, assets and liabilities, in anticipation of the new district beginning independent operation on July 1 the following year.

Schools 
 Jacksonville High School
 Jacksonville Middle School
 Bayou Meto Elementary School
 Bobby G. Lester Elementary School
 Warren Dupree Elementary School
 Pinewood Elementary School
 Murrell Taylor Elementary School
 Homer Adkins Pre-Kindergarten Center

Former Schools 
 Arnold Drive Elementary School (closed following 2017-2018 school year; replaced by Bobby G. Lester Elementary School)
 Tolleson Elementary School (closed following 2017-2018 school year; replaced by Bobby G. Lester Elementary School)

Planned Schools 
 Jacksonville Elementary School (slated for opening in January 2022; to replace Warren Dupree Elementary and Pinewood Elementary schools)

Athletics
In 2016 the district began trademarking its athletic logos, so people selling merchandise reflecting the school district have to pay the school district.

References

External links 
Official Website

School districts in Arkansas
Jacksonville, Arkansas
Schools in Pulaski County, Arkansas
2016 establishments in Arkansas
School districts established in 2016